Chelonii may refer to:

 Chelonii, the order of turtles.
 Chelonioidea, the superfamily of sea turtles, who have a synonym of Chelonii.
 Cheloniidae, a family of sea turtle, who have a synonym of Chelonii.